Golbui-ye Bala (also Romanized as Golbūī-ye Bālā; also known as Golbū-ye Bālā, Golbū, and Golbū ‘Olyā) is a village in Belharat Rural District, Miyan Jolgeh District, Nishapur County, Razavi Khorasan Province, Iran. At the 2006 census, its population was 372, in 107 families.

References 

Populated places in Nishapur County